Dickinson's Real Deal is a UK modern antiques and collectables television programme that is broadcast on ITV and presented by David Dickinson. A US version of the show, produced by Zodiak USA and titled simply Real Deal, was aired for one series on the History Channel. The format was the same except that the US show lacked the on-screen host for intervention on the deals.

Format
The shows are recorded at UK venues to which members of the public are invited to bring their antiques and collectables. Independent valuers estimate the value of these items.

The items are then passed to the dealers, who make their own valuation and try to purchase them by placing a cash offer on the table. Once the initial offer is placed the sellers will often ask for a higher amount. Then, David Dickinson will often step in to give some advice and reveal the valuers estimations. David, being on the side of the seller; will then haggle with and edge the dealer to give more money. This will quite often lead to the dealer's offer being adjusted. The valuers' estimations are revealed to the owner, the television audience and the dealer.

The seller then decides whether to accept or decline what the dealer has offered. If the deal is declined items go to auction where David can be seen with the seller watching over proceeding in the sale room.

Present dealers

Dealers featured in the series at present;
Alison Chapman
Henry Nicholls   
Karen Dalmeny
Jo Brayshaw 
Cheryl Hakeney
Tim Hogarth
Simon Schneider
Stewart Hofgartner
Michael Hogben
Jan Keyne
Monty English
James Layte
Alistair Lamont
Helen Gardiner
Anna Rennie
Tony Geering
Fay Rutter 
Jon O'Marah
Chris Skitch
Aidan Pass
Mark Stevens
Nick Barbie Agent (21 June 2021)
Corrie Jefferey
Alys Dobbie
Debbie Serpell
David Hakeney
Tracy Thackray-Howitt
Abdul Ahmed
Laurie Scully

Former dealers
Brenda Haller
Cheryl Brown
Ian Towning
George Baldwin
David Tupman
Clive Attrell
Rob Bingham
David Ford
Mike Melody

References

External links
 

2006 British television series debuts
2000s British television series
2010s British television series
2020s British television series
Antiques television series
Auction television series
English-language television shows
ITV (TV network) original programming
Television series by Banijay